Football Club Renaissance du Congo or simply FC Renaissance is a Congolese football club based in Kinshasa.

History
The club is founded in 2015.

Honours
Coupe du Congo
 Winners (1): 2016
 Runner-up (1): 2019
DR Congo Super Cup
 Runner-up (1): 2016
Entente Provinciale de Football de Kinshasa (EPFKIN)
 Winners (1): 2015–16

Performance in CAF competitions
CAF Confederation Cup: 1 appearance
2017 – First round (round of 32)

References

External links
Official website

Football clubs in the Democratic Republic of the Congo
Football clubs in Kinshasa